Randolph P. Thummel is an American chemist specializing in organic and inorganic chemistry, and is currently the John and Rebecca Moores Professor at the University of Houston.

References

Year of birth missing (living people)
Living people
University of Houston faculty
21st-century American chemists
University of California, Santa Barbara alumni
Brown University alumni